The DAR (Dalnii Arkticheskii Razvyedchik – long range Arctic reconnaissance), was a twin-engined flying boat designed and produced in the USSR from 1934.

Development
In 1934 Roberto L. Bartini was assigned to the ZOK NII GVF (Zavod Opytno Konstrooktorskoye Naoochno-Issledovatel'skiy Institoot Grazhdanskovo Vozdooshnovo Flota — Factory for Special Construction at the Scientific Test Institute for the Civil Air Fleet), to lead the design of the DAR. Built entirely of Enerzh-6 stainless steel, the DAR closely resembled the Dornier Wal, with a high length to beam ratio hull, sponsons either side of the hull, strut supported parasol wing and twin engines in a single nacelle in the centre of the wing. Initially Bartini intended the two engines to drive separate propellers running in a tubular shroud, much like a modern ducted fan; Tests at TsAGI (Tsentrahl'nyy Aerodinamicheskiy i Ghidrodinamicheskiy Institoot - central aerodynamics and hydrodynamics institute) confirmed Bartini's theories but the prototype was completed with a conventional tandem tractor/pusher engine nacelle.

Apart from the 'Enerzh-6' construction material, the DAR had several other innovations, including;
full span slotted  flaps, and pivoting wing-tip ailerons which were in two sections, fore and aft.
During later testing steel faced skis were attached to the fuselage sides by rubber bag springs. Flight testing was carried out at the small boat port at Leningrad in the spring of 1936, with no major problems, and five more were ordered but production was not carried out.

Specifications (DAR)

See also

References

External links

 https://web.archive.org/web/20070703081400/http://www.aviation.ru/Bartini/

DAR
1930s Soviet military reconnaissance aircraft
Flying boats
Twin-engined push-pull aircraft
Parasol-wing aircraft
Aircraft first flown in 1936